Welcome to My Nightmare is a 1976 concert film of Alice Cooper's show of the same name. It was produced, directed and choreographed by David Winters. The film accompanied the album, the stage show (also produced, directed and choreographed by Winters) by the same name and the TV special Alice Cooper: The Nightmare, the first ever rock music video album, starring Cooper and Vincent Price in person. Though it failed at the box office, it later became a midnight movie favorite and a cult classic.

Background
In 1975, Alice Cooper released his first solo album, Welcome to My Nightmare, and a huge theatrical stage show was created and put together by Winters to 'tour the album'. While in the past the Alice Cooper stage show was semi-improvisatory, with confrontational elements of violence and satire (see Good to See You Again, Alice Cooper), the new production was purely horror-themed and professionally choreographed and performed to the split second (Winters had a long history of choreographing and directing big celebrity films, stage and TV shows starring in the cast of West Side Story and choreographing 4 films with Elvis Presley and 5 films with Ann-Margret). With the edginess removed (gone were the bloody guillotine, the spit and the skewered baby dolls, although "Only Women Bleed" presented a drunken, physically abusive side to the character), the Welcome to My Nightmare show was part a carefully planned move toward a more mainstream-friendly 'Alice'.

Welcome to My Nightmare was a phantasmagorical exposition of music and theatre themed around a nightmare experienced by a young boy named Steven. Costing US$600,000 to produce, the show was a grand visual spectacle with an elaborate stage set, pre-filmed projections, four dancers, and elaborate costumes. Set in a graveyard/bedroom, a well-drilled band ran through the new album and a selection of older hits, while Alice encountered giant spiders, dancing skeletons, faceless silver demons and a 9-foot 'cyclops'.

Concert footage was taken from a series of London shows at the Wembley Arena on September 11–12, 1975. The film is out of sequence with the live show, and the final Department of Youth segment has some post-production inserts.

Before "Some Folks", a short medley was performed as the dancers danced in their skeleton costumes. The medley consisted of "Halo of Flies" (from Cooper's Killer album), "The Black Widow", and "Didn't We Meet" (which would be released on Cooper's next album, Alice Cooper Goes to Hell).

Release

The film was a box office failure in its original 1976 release. However, like Phantom of the Paradise, The Rocky Horror Picture Show and others, Welcome to My Nightmare found a low-volume but dependable audience on the midnight movie circuit.

The film was first issued commercially on VHS in 1981, with numerous reissues since. A DVD issue was released in 2002, with the US version featuring commentary by Cooper.

Track listing
Opening credits - The Awakening
Welcome To My Nightmare
Years Ago
No More Mr. Nice Guy
Years Ago (reprise)
I'm Eighteen
Some Folks
Cold Ethyl
Only Women Bleed
 Years Ago (reprise)
 Billion Dollar Babies
 Devil's Food
The Black Widow
Steven
Welcome to My Nightmare (reprise)
Escape
School's Out
Department of Youth
End credits - Only Women Bleed (alternate version)

Personnel
 Alice Cooper - Vocals
 Dick Wagner - Guitar, Vocals
 Steve Hunter - Guitar
 Josef Chirowski - Synthesizer, Keyboards, Clavinet, Fender Rhodes, Vocals
 Prakash John - Bass, Vocals
 Pentti "Whitey" Glan - Drums

See also
 List of American films of 1975

References

External links 
 
 

American documentary films
Concert films
Alice Cooper
1976 documentary films
1970s English-language films
Films directed by David Winters
1970s American films